Adolf Weidmann (8 October 1901 in Frankfurt am Main – 26 June 1997) was a German athlete and sports official. He is best known for his numerous age-group records in the ultra-marathon.

Life

General
He was the first of five sons of Adolf Weidmann and his wife Caroline. The family moved to Riga, Warsaw and Kiev to Rovno, where his father worked as a brewer. With the outbreak of World War II came the designation and the family moved to Lorraine, which they had to leave after the end of the war. They finally came to Glan-Münchweiler in Rheinland-Pfalz.

Weidmann begun at an early age with the sport. In 1922 he co-founded the "Turn-und Sport-Verein Glan-Münchweiler. During his studies of economics and his promotion about the taxation of beer, he participated in several College and High School Championships. His strongest competition distances were then 800 meters to 5,000 meters. As chairman of Deutsche Bundesbank's employee-council, he was involved in the creation and development of their sports department.

When Weidmann was 64-year-old, he learned in 1966 for the first time of the Bieler days with the ultra-marathon running over 100 kilometres. He later said: ". Without thinking much, I thought that this was possible" In the same year he started his first race in Biel and finished in 17 hours 8 minutes. In 1974 he ran his fastest 100-kilometre run with 14:50 hh:mm. 1982 he brought the world record in his age group M80 (men aged 80 years). After that, he was always at the start and ran in 1986 with 21 hours to the German age-group record for the M85 age group (men over 85 years). Two years later (1988) he reached even the world record 21:32:21 in this age group. In 1991 he ran as a 90-year-old this distance in 22:35:13.

In August 1995, he was 92 years old at that time, he participated in a 10.000m run at the doctors and pharmacists Championship. He commented about it, that the journey to the race was harder for him than the race itself. He finished in 95 minutes.

On November the 25 in 1994 the German Ultra-Marathon-Union (DUV) promoted him to their first Honorary Member and founded in October 1997 after his death, the Dr. Adolf Weidmann price.

Teaspoon Rations

Due to problems with food intake during his runs, Weidmann wanted to end his ultramarathon-career in the mid-1970s. After the Munich Marathon September the 17th in 1977 he discovered that he tolerated beer in very small sips. This method, he called it "teaspoon-rations", then has contributed since 1978 to his success. It was the only way for Adolf Weidmann to drink during a race and he wouldn't have been able to finish without his teaspoon-rations-method. However, he later preferred mineral water or milk instead of beer later.

Adolf Weidmann and Biel 

Weidmann started 23 times in total at the Bieler 100 km-Run and finished 20 times. He gained four age-group-records, of which three are valid until today (2011):

Adolf Weidmann as Author
Adolf Weidmann has written some reports about his races. For example a very detailed report about his first race in Biel is published (in German) on www.steppenhahn.de. He also published several stories in the local papers of his home, the Westrich-Kalender, about the  local environment (e.g. local history, traditions and customs,...).

1983 Adolf Weidmann also wrote an article about himself and his training with respect to the Biel 100 km run to the Westrich-Kalender.

External links 
 List of the Honorary Members of the German Ultra-Marathon-Union
 100km Race in Biel on steppenhahn.de with Links to Adolf Weidmann's Running-Reports
 100km Race in Biel/Bienne (CH)

1901 births
1997 deaths
German male long-distance runners
Sportspeople from Frankfurt